The Land of Laughs is a low fantasy novel by American writer Jonathan Carroll.  It was first published by Viking Press in 1980 and is the author's first novel.  The novel was notably reprinted by Orion Books in 2000 as volume 9 of their Fantasy Masterworks series.

Plot summary

In a used book store, Thomas Abbey, an avid fan of Marshall France, a deceased writer of unique children's books, has a chance encounter with Saxony Gardner, another enthusiast of that reclusive man. Together, they set out to the fictitious town of Galen, Missouri, to meet Anna France, the writer's daughter, in order to obtain her permission to write Marshall France's biography. Prepared for rejection, they are warmly welcomed and settle into the community and their literary endeavor.

However, they find an uncanny resemblance between the town of Galen and its inhabitants, and the literary world of their idol. Figures from Marshall France's books are alive in Galen, and Thomas and Saxony begin to question if the books were patterned on Galen, or if the writer's magic created Galen. Equally disturbing is Thomas's role as biographer: he appears to create reality by his writing, and begins to question the motives of Anna and the inhabitants of Galen. Events reach a crisis point when Thomas's biography reaches the time of Marshall France's arrival in Galen.

Notes

References

1980 American novels
1980 fantasy novels
American fantasy novels
Novels by Jonathan Carroll
Metafictional novels
Viking Press books
1980 debut novels